SMQ may refer to:

 IATA code for H. Asan Airport, Sampit Airport
 FAA LID code for Somerset Airport (New Jersey)
 Social Marketing Quarterly
 Standardized MedDRA Query